UFC 173: Barão vs. Dillashaw was a mixed martial arts event held at the MGM Grand Garden Arena in Las Vegas, Nevada on May 24, 2014.

Background
A Middleweight Championship bout between then champion Chris Weidman and number one contender Vitor Belfort was scheduled to headline this event. However, on February 27, the Nevada State Athletic Commission officially banned testosterone replacement therapy (TRT) from combat sports. Belfort, who was using such therapy, was forced to withdraw from the bout and stated, "Given the time constraints involved between now and my proposed next bout in May, I have determined not to apply for a license to fight in Nevada at this time."

The main event was quickly changed as former UFC Light Heavyweight Champion Lyoto Machida agreed to step in to face Weidman for the title. However, on March 24, the UFC announced that Weidman had suffered a knee injury and that a new headline bout would be found.  The Weidman title defense against Machida was moved to UFC 175 in July.

After the announcement that Weidman/Machida bout had been moved, a Bantamweight Championship bout between Renan Barão and Raphael Assunção was targeted as the event headliner.  However, Assunção opted to decline the bout as a rib injury sustained in his last bout at UFC 170 had not healed enough to resume the proper training in advance of the event.  Barão instead fought T.J. Dillashaw in the main event.  As a result, Dillashaw's original opponent at the event, Takeya Mizugaki, faced Francisco Rivera.

The originally scheduled co-main event was Junior dos Santos against Stipe Miocic.  However, that bout was moved to The Ultimate Fighter Brazil 3 Finale.  Subsequently, the bout between Dan Henderson and Daniel Cormier, briefly linked to UFC 175 was moved up to this event to bolster the card.

The coaches bout between The Ultimate Fighter: Brazil 3 participants Chael Sonnen and Wanderlei Silva was briefly linked to this event. However, the fight was moved twice – first being on May 31, 2014 at The Ultimate Fighter: Brazil 3 Finale, then it was to be contested on July 5, 2014 at UFC 175 but the fight eventually was called off for various reasons.

A lightweight bout between Yves Edwards and Piotr Hallmann was expected to take place at this event. However, the fight was moved to UFC Fight Night 42.

Kyung Ho Kang was expected to face Chris Holdsworth at the event.  However, Kang pulled out of the bout and was replaced by Chico Camus.

Doo Ho Choi was expected to make his promotional debut at the event against Sam Sicilia.  However, Choi was forced out of the bout with an injury, and was replaced by UFC newcomer Aaron Phillips.

Danny Mitchell was expected to face promotional newcomer Li Jingliang.  However, Mitchell pulled out of the bout with an injury.  Replacing Mitchell was The Ultimate Fighter: Team Carwin vs. Team Nelson cast member David Michaud.

Results

Bonus awards
The following fighters were awarded $50,000 bonuses:
Fight of the Night: Renan Barão vs. T.J. Dillashaw
 Performance of the Night: T.J. Dillashaw and Mitch Clarke

Reported payout
The following is the reported payout to the fighters as reported to the Nevada State Athletic Commission. It does not include sponsor money and also does not include the UFC's traditional "fight night" bonuses.
 T.J. Dillashaw: $36,000 (includes $18,000 win bonus) def. Renan Barão: $74,000
 Daniel Cormier: $170,000 (includes $85,000 win bonus) def. Dan Henderson: $100,000
 Robbie Lawler: $200,000 (includes $100,000 win bonus) def. Jake Ellenberger: $68,000
 Takeya Mizugaki: $58,000 (includes $29,000 win bonus) def. Francisco Rivera: $15,000
 James Krause: $20,000 (includes $10,000 win bonus) def. Jamie Varner: $17,000
 Michael Chiesa: $40,000 (includes $20,000 win bonus) def. Francisco Trinaldo: $12,000
 Tony Ferguson: $40,000 (includes $20,000 win bonus) def. Katsunori Kikuno: $10,000
 Chris Holdsworth: $30,000 (includes $15,000 win bonus) def. Chico Camus: $12,000
 Mitch Clarke: $20,000 (includes $10,000 win bonus) def. Al Iaquinta: $14,000
 Vinc Pichel: $16,000 (includes $8,000 win bonus) def. Anthony Njokuani: $20,000
 Sam Sicilia: $20,000 (includes $10,000 win bonus) def. Aaron Phillips: $8,000
 Li Jingliang: $16,000 (includes $10,000 win bonus) def. David Michaud: $8,000

See also
List of UFC events
2014 in UFC

References

Ultimate Fighting Championship events
Mixed martial arts in Las Vegas
2014 in mixed martial arts
MGM Grand Garden Arena